Caloptilia phalaropa is a moth of the family Gracillariidae. It is known from Sri Lanka.

References

phalaropa
Moths of Asia
Moths described in 1912